Keshavrao Date (1889–1971) was an Indian film actor, who worked in both silent and sound movies. He tried to run his own drama company but found it difficult to perform the dual roles of manager and actor.

Career
His role in the drama Andhalyanchi Shala ("The Blinds' School", 1933)  won him rave reviews, subsequently he became a star, and also joined the Prabhat Film Company.

After the advent of talkies, he tried his hand at that medium as well, though live theatre remained his chief love. His acting in the Marathi film Kunku (1937) set a standard which has rarely been approached since on the silver screen. He followed it with another sterling performance in Prabhat Film Company's Shejari (1941). Later he performed character roles in films made in Mumbai, where he lived. He also acted in V. Shantaram's Dr. Kotnis Ki Amar Kahani (1946), Jhanak Jhanak Payal Baaje (1955), Navrang  (1959) and  Geet Gaya Patharon Ne (1964).

Keshavrao directed four films, Kisise Na Kehna (1942), Andhon Ki Duniya (1947), and Maali or Mali in Hindi (1944) and it's Marathi version Bhakticha Mala (1944). Maali and Bhakticha Mala (1944) were Date's the second and third of his directorial ventures, and were produced by V. Shantaram under his new banner Rajkamal Kalamandir.

Filmography

As actor
 Amrit Manthan (1934)
 Kunku (1937, Marathi)
 Chingari (1940)
 Shejari (Padosi) (1941)
 Kisise Na Kehna (1942)  also director
 Dr. Kotnis Ki Amar Kahani (1946)
 Apna Desh (1949)
 Dahej (1950)
 Jhanak Jhanak Payal Baaje (1955)
 Toofan Aur Deeya (1956)
 Navrang  (1959)
 Geet Gaya Patharon Ne (1964)

As director
 Kisise Na Kehna (1942)
 Andhon Ki Duniya (1947)
 Maali (1944) in Hindi 
 Bhakticha Mala (1944) Marathi version of Maali

References

External links

1889 births
1971 deaths
Indian male silent film actors
Male actors in Hindi cinema
Male actors in Marathi cinema
20th-century Indian male actors
Male actors in Marathi theatre
Recipients of the Sangeet Natak Akademi Award